Sangalhos Desporto Clube, better known as Sangalhos DC, is a Portuguese basketball club from Sangalhos. The team plays in the Liga Portuguesa de Basquetebol. Sangalhos played in the 1994–95 FIBA Korać Cup, where it was eliminated by Manchester Giants in the first round.

Current roster

Honours
Primeira Divisão
Champions (2): 2001–02, 2002–03

Players

Notable players
 Cedric Miller

References

Basketball teams in Portugal